"Coming Home" is a song performed by British pop singers The Soldiers. It was written by Jake Hook, Nick Patrick and Jeff Chegwin and produced by Patrick for The Soldier's first album Coming Home. Released on 6 October 2009 serving as the album's lead single, available on digital download only.

Background
"Coming Home", a song written by Jake Hook, Nick Patrick and Jeff Chegwin and produced by Patrick for The Soldier's first album Coming Home  The song's lyrics are a stirring wish and plead for Army personnel to come home safely,  The song features a tin whistle, piano, bass, drum and full string section.  The song's structure is as follows, introduction, first verse, chorus, second verse, string section instrumental, chorus to end.

The song which is four minutes and eight seconds, is in a 4/4 time signature.  The vocals were recorded by Gary Chilton, Richie Maddocks and Ryan Idzi.

Promotion
The Soldiers' first interview was with The Sun.  Readers were invited to log on to The Sun's website to download the track for free for 48 hours.

The Soldiers' first official UK TV appearance to talk about Coming Home, was with Adam Boulton on SkyNews on Sunday 18 October 2009. The Soldiers also appeared on 'The Alan Titchmarsh Show and GMTV promoting the single.

Credits and personnel

Lead vocals – Sergeant Major Gary Chilton, Lance Corporal Ryan Idzi and Staff Sergeant Richie Maddocks
Music - Jake Hook
Lyrics - Jeff Chegwin, Jake Hook, Nick Patrick
Producer – Nick Patrick
Programming – Jake Hook
String arrangement – Francis Haines, Jake Hook
Concept Jeff Chegwin and Nick Patrick

Formats
The single was made available as a free download via The Sun's website.  The version given away was the album version, which contains an instrumental string section.  The length of this version is 4 minutes and 8 seconds.

The download version which was made available to major download sites such as iTunes, Amazon and Play.com cut the string instrumental and a portion of the introduction and lasts 2 minutes and 56 seconds.

Songs about soldiers
Songs about the military
2009 singles
The Soldiers songs
2009 songs
Rhino Entertainment singles
Songs written by Jake Hook